Dead Man's Gun was a western anthology series on Showtime from 1997 to 1999. The series followed the travels of a gun as it passed to a new character in each episode. The gun would change the life of whoever possessed it.

Each episode was narrated by Kris Kristofferson. The executive producer was Henry Winkler.

Plot
Set in the Old West, this anthology follows the eponymous artifact, a handsome yet cursed gun that brings either disaster or fortune to whoever possesses it. In some cases of the former consequence, the gun's more villainous owners are killed at the end of the episode, while in others they live but suffer for their misdeeds.

In a similar fashion to The Twilight Zone and  The Outer Limits, there are often twist endings to the stories. For example, in the episode, "The Collector", the main character discovers that his servant is actually the infamous criminal, El Lobo, who then scalps him. And the series finale, "A Just Reward", provides a twist ending to the series as a whole when it is ultimately revealed that the gun's  original owner was the Grim Reaper.

Cast

Main
 Kris Kristofferson as The Narrator

Guests
 John Ritter
 John Glover
 Frank Whaley
 Henry Winkler
 Larry Drake
 William Katt
 Matt Frewer
 JoBeth Williams
 Kim Coates
 Gordon Clapp
 Grant Shaud
 Daphne Zuniga
 Graham Greene
 Adam Beach

Episodes

Season 1 (1997–1998)
Season 1 consisted of 22 Episodes.

 The first three episodes were aired as a single TV movie

Season 2 (1998–1999)
Season 2 consisted of 22 Episodes.

Home media
On February 15, 2011, Alliance Home Entertainment released the complete first season of Dead Man's Gun on DVD in Canada only.  Season 2 was released on March 15, 2011. On April 2, 2013, TGG Direct released both seasons on DVD in the US.

References

External links
 
 
 
Dead Man's Gun at Metro-Goldwyn-Mayer Studios

Showtime (TV network) original programming
1990s American anthology television series
1997 American television series debuts
1999 American television series endings
1990s Western (genre) television series
English-language television shows
Television series by MGM Television
Television shows about weaponry